Nathaniel Savory (1794 - 1874) was one of the first American colonists who is said to have settled on the Ogasawara Islands.  He eventually became governor, and played an active role in government before and during the colonization by Japan.

Life 
Nathaniel Savory was born in Bradford, Massachusetts and eventually relocated to Hawaii. In 1830 he headed out for an adventure expedition, led by Matteo Mazzaro (of Italian-British descent), and accompanied by a small group of Americans, British, and Hawaiians who all eventually settled in Ōgiura, Chichi-jima. After a shift in power and the death of Matteo Mazzaro, Savory became governor of the islanders.

In April 1853, Admiral Matthew Perry made a stop at the island on the way to Japan  established a colonial government plan, and chose Savory as the leader of the immigrants.

In December 1861, when Tadakuni Mizuno and others landed on the island, the Japanese began taking control.  In 1862 the islands were claimed by Japan, but Savory was left in charge of the islanders.

In literature
Nathaniel Savory is a prominent character in the 1943 novel Bonin by Robert Standish.

References

Bonin Islands
American emigrants to Japan
People from Bradford, Massachusetts
1794 births
1874 deaths